The Giant Baba Memorial Spectacular was a professional wrestling memorial event produced by the All Japan Pro Wrestling (AJPW) and New Japan Pro-Wrestling (NJPW) promotions, which took place on January 28, 2001 at the Tokyo Dome in Tokyo, Japan. The event's  Japanese name translates to "Kings Road New Century 2001" but it was commonly referred to in the Japanese and English language press as the "Giant Baba Memorial Spectacular." The event was themed around memorializing AJPW's founder Shohei "Giant" Baba, who had died in 1999. It was the second Giant Baba Memorial event and was subsequently followed by the Giant Baba Memorial Cup and the Giant Baba Memorial Six Man Tag Team Tournament a year later. Ten professional wrestling matches were held on the event's card, including one that featured AJPW and NJPW champions.

The main event was an inter-promotional tag team "Dream Match" that pitted New Japan's IWGP Heavyweight Champion Kensuke Sasaki and All Japan's Toshiaki Kawada against AJPW Triple Crown Heavyweight Champion Genichiro Tenryu and Hiroshi Hase, a one-time star for New Japan and then-member of the Japanese parliament. Another featured bout was a tag team "Legends Match" that saw Terry Funk team with longtime rival Atsushi Onita to take on Abdullah the Butcher and Giant Kimala; Funk and Onita were victorious. The event featured two additional inter-promotional matches on the undercard; New Japan's Jyushin Thunder Liger defeated All Japan's Masa Fuchi and NJPW's Keiji Mutoh beat AJPW's Taiyō Kea. In another prominent undercard match, the team of Johnny Smith, Jim Steele, and George Hines defeated Mike Rotunda, Curt Hennig, and Barry Windham (substituting for an injured Kendall Windham). The show also included the in-ring retirement ceremony for Stan Hansen, one of the most dominant gaijin heels in AJPW history. The ceremony featured appearances from several All Japan and New Japan alumni including Pete Roberts, Seiji Sakaguchi, The Destroyer, and Mil Máscaras.

The event was highly anticipated according to the professional wrestling section of the Canadian Online Explorer, especially the "dream teams" featured in the main event, but later reported that it attracted "a disappointing crowd of 30,000 fans". The show was aired on Nippon TV two days after it occurred.

Results

References

2001 in professional wrestling
All Japan Pro Wrestling
New Japan Pro-Wrestling shows
Professional wrestling memorial shows
Professional wrestling in Tokyo
Professional wrestling joint events